Melinda Takeuchi is an academic, an author, a Japanologist and a Professor in the Department of East Asian Languages and Cultures and the Department of Art History at Stanford University.

Early life
Takeuchi grew up in what was then rural-Malibu in Southern California.  In 1966, she earned a B.A. in Asian Studies at the University of California, Santa Barbara (UCSB).  She continued her studies at UCSB, earning a M.A. with Honors in the History of Art in 1972.  In Japan in 1975–1976, she was a Research Fellow at Waseda University in Tokyo.

Takeuchi was awarded her Ph.D. in the History of Art in 1979 at the University of Michigan.

Career
Takeuchi invested thirty years climbing the tenure-track ladder at Stanford.

In recent years, Takeuchi's life in academia has been balanced by the activities associated with breeding Friesian horses on a small ranch in Northern California.

Selected works
In a statistical overview derived from writings by and about Melinda Takeuchi, OCLC/WorldCat encompasses roughly 10+ works in 20+ publications in 2 languages and 1,000+ library holdings.

 Poem paintings: [catalog of] an Exhibition 29th November-13th December 1977 (1977)
 Visions of a Wanderer: the True View Paintings of Ike Taiga (1723-1776) (1979)
 Ike Taiga, a Biographical Study (1983)
 Taiga's True Views: the Language of Landscape Painting in Eighteenth-Century Japan (1992)
 Origins of Modern Society: Legacies and Visions of East Asian Cultures. Tape 13, From Modelbook to Sketchbook: Sinophiles, Europhiles, and the Explosion of Visual Thinking in Eighteenth-Century Japanese Art (1992)
 Worlds Seen and Imagined: Japanese Screens from the Idemitsu Museum of Arts: [the Asia Society Galleries, New York], October 18 - December 31, 1995 (1995)
 The Artist as Professional in Japan (2004)
 Revisiting Modern Japanese Prints: Selected Works from the Richard F. Grott Family Collection: Northern Illinois University Art Museum, January 15-March 7, 2008 (2007)

Honors
1995: Association for Asian Studies, John Whitney Hall Book Prize, 1997.

Notes

Living people
Stanford University Department of East Asian Languages and Cultures faculty
University of California, Santa Barbara alumni
American Japanologists
Year of birth missing (living people)
University of Michigan alumni